Elections to Manchester City Council were held on 7 May 2015, along with the 2015 United Kingdom general election. One third of the council was up for election, with each successful candidate serving a three-year term of office, expiring in 2018, due to planned boundary changes. The Labour Party retained overall control of the council, managing to hold every seat contested.

Result
Changes in vote share are compared to the 2014 election.

Ward results
Asterisks denote incumbent Councillors seeking re-election. Councillors seeking re-election were elected in 2011, and results are compared to that year's polls on that basis. All results are listed below:

Ancoats and Clayton

Ardwick

Baguley

Bradford

Brooklands

Burnage

Charlestown

Cheetham

Chorlton

Chorlton Park

City Centre

Crumpsall

Didsbury East

Didsbury West

Fallowfield

Gorton North

Gorton South

Harpurhey

Higher Blackley

Hulme

Levenshulme

Longsight

Miles Platting and Newton Heath

Moss Side

Moston

Northenden

Old Moat

Rusholme

Sharston

Whalley Range

Withington

Woodhouse Park

By-elections between 2015 and 2016

Higher Blackley: 18 February 2016

References

2015 English local elections
May 2015 events in the United Kingdom
2015
2010s in Manchester